The 1989 Argentina rugby union tour of New Zealand was a series of nine matches played by the Argentina national rugby union team in July 1989.

Matches

NORTH AUCKLAND: W.Johnson; K.Woodman, T.Brock, B.Kini, M.Seymour M.Younger; K.McQuilkin, C.Hull; N.Ruddell, W.Phillips, I.Jones; F.Lambourn, M.Budd; G.Courtney, M.Barry (Capt.), B.Le Clerc.ARGENTINA: A.Scolni; M.Righentini, D.Cuesta Silva, M.Loffreda (capt.), M.Allen, C.Mendy; R.Madero, D.Baetti; P.Garretón, G.Milano, P.Di Nisio; M.Valesani, P.Buabse; D.Cash, R.Le Fort, S.Dengra. 

 KING COUNTRY : D.Perham; A.James, P.Coffin, H.Coffin, S.Bradley; N.Swain, H.Leach; C.Iti, G.Meads, G.Geffries; M.Johnson, R.Alve; G.Lethbourg, P.Mitchell, T.Stuart. ARGENTINA: A.Scolni; M.Righentini, M.Loffreda (capt.), D.Cuesta Silva, C.Mendy; R.Madero, D.Baetti; P.Garretón, G.Milano ( J.Uriarte), P.Di Nisio; P.Buabse, A.Iachetti; L.Molina, J.J.Angelillo, S.Dengra.

AUCKLAND:Pi.Ridge; J.Kirwan, J.Stanley, B.McCahill, T.Wright; G.Fox, B.Iti; M.Jones, Z.Brooke, A.Whetton; G.Whetton; M.Brooke; O.Brown, M.Dowd, P.Fatialofa.ARGENTINA:A.Scolni; D.Cuesta Silva, M.Loffreda (capt.), F.Turnes, G.Mendy ( M.Righentini); R.Madero, D.Baetti; P.Di Nisio, J.Uriarte, P.Garretón; P.Buabse, A.Iachetti; D.Cash, J.J.Angelillo, S.Dengra. 

 WAIRARAPA-BUSH: C.Pepperell; M.Foster, P.Bresaz, H.Reedy, D.Rutene; G.Gray, B.Lett (capt.); L.Christiansen, G.Hawkins (G.Rolston; P.Berry, P.Smith; C.Kapene, C.Lett, B.Styles.cARGENTINA: S.Salvat; D.Cuesta Silva, F.Turnes, M.Allen, C.Mendy; D.Dominguez, F.Gómez; M.Baeck, G.Milano (capt.), M.Bertranou; A.Iachetti, M.Valesani; L.Molina, R.Le Fort, A.Rocca. 

 HANAN SHIELD XV:  A.Stevenson; G.Frew, P.Ryan, C.Dorgan, S.Tarrant; B.Faírbrother, B.Matthews; J.Cook, J, Simpson, D.Ineson; P.Cockburn, W.Frew; J.Harrison, L.McDonald (capt.), R.Morgan. ARGENTINA: J.Soler; D.Cuesta Silva, M.Loffreda (capt.), P.Garzón ( M.Allen), M.Righentini; D.Dominguez, F.Silvestre; M.Baeck, J, Uriarte, P.Garretón; J.Simes, A.Iachetti; L.Molina, R.Le Fort, S, Dengra. 

CANTERBURY: R.Deans; P, Bale, A.McCormick, W.Maunsell, W.Taylor; S.Bachop, G.Bachop; R.Penney, J.Jackson, M.Henderson; A.Anderson (capt.), A.Earl; K.Hill, J.Buchan, C.Earl. ARGENTINA: S.Salvat; D.Cuesta Silva, M.Loffreda (capt.), F.Turnes, A.Scolni, R.Madero, F.Gómez; P.Di Nisio, G.Milano, P.Garretón; A.Iachetti, J.Uriarte; D.Cash, J.J.Angelillo, A.Rocca. 

 WAIKATO: D.Halligan; W.Jennings, A.Strawbridge, R.McIntosh, P.Simonsson; B.Craies, K.Putt; D.Monkley, J.Mitchell, T.Coventry; B.Anderson, R.Jerram; G.Purvis, W.Batland, R.Loe.ARGENTINA: S.Salvat; M.Righentini, M.Loffreda (capt.) ( A.Scolni), F.Turnes, D.Cuesta Silva; R.Madero, D.Baetti; M.Bertranou, J.Uriarte ( G.Milano, M.Baeck; M.Valesani, P.Buabse; L.Molina; R.Le Fort, S.Dengra.

Sources

1989
1989
1989 in New Zealand rugby union
tours